874 Rotraut (prov. designation:  or ) is a dark and elongated background asteroid, approximately  in diameter, located in the outer region of the asteroid belt. It was discovered on 25 May 1917, by astronomer Max Wolf at the Heidelberg-Königstuhl State Observatory is southwest Germany. The hydrated carbonaceous C-type asteroid (Ch) has a rotation period of 14.3 hours. It was likely named after the ballad Schön Rotraut by German lyric poet Eduard Mörike (1804–1875).

Orbit and classification 

Rotraut is a non-family asteroid of the main belt's background population when applying the hierarchical clustering method to its proper orbital elements. It orbits the Sun in the outer asteroid belt at a distance of 2.9–3.4 AU once every 5 years and 7 months (2,044 days; semi-major axis of 3.15 AU). Its orbit has an eccentricity of 0.08 and an inclination of 11° with respect to the ecliptic. The body's observation arc begins at Heidelberg Observatory with its official discovery observation on 25 May 1917.

Naming 

"Rotraut" is a feminine German first name. This minor planet was likely named after the ballad Schön Rotraut (Pretty Rohtraut) by the German lyric poet Eduard Mörike (1804–1875). Lutz Schmadel, the author of the Dictionary of Minor Planet Names learned about Wolf's source of inspiration from private communications with Dutch astronomer Ingrid van Houten-Groeneveld, who worked as a young astronomer at Heidelberg.

Physical characteristics 

In the Tholen-like taxonomy of the Small Solar System Objects Spectroscopic Survey (S3OS2), Rotraut is a carbonaceous C-type asteroid (Caa), while in the survey's SMASS-like taxonomic variation it is a hydrated C-type (Ch).

Rotation period 

Two rotational lightcurves of Rotraut were obtained from photometric observations by Richard Ditteon at Oakley Southern Sky Observatory , Australia, in February 2017, and by Tom Polakis at the Command Module Observatory  in Arizona in May 2018. The result supersedes a tentative period determination of  hours and an amplitude of  magnitude by French amateur astronomers Stéphane Charbonnel and Claudine Rinner from July 2002.

In 2016, a modeled lightcurve gave a sidereal period of  hours using data from the Uppsala Asteroid Photometric Catalogue, the Palomar Transient Factory survey, and individual observers (such as above), as well as sparse-in-time photometry from the NOFS, the Catalina Sky Survey, and the La Palma surveys . The study also determined two spin axes of (201.0°, −41.0°) and (2.0°, −36.0°) in ecliptic coordinates (λ, β).

Diameter and albedo 

The Collaborative Asteroid Lightcurve Link derives an albedo of 0.0506 and a diameter of 56.42 kilometers based on an absolute magnitude of 10.1.

These timed observations are taken when the asteroid passes in front of a distant star. However the quality of the measurement is rated poorly.

References

External links 
 Pretty Rohtraut, The LiederNet Archive
 Lightcurve Database Query (LCDB), at www.minorplanet.info
 Dictionary of Minor Planet Names, Google books
 Asteroids and comets rotation curves, CdR – Geneva Observatory, Raoul Behrend
 Discovery Circumstances: Numbered Minor Planets (1)-(5000) – Minor Planet Center
 
 

000874
Discoveries by Max Wolf
Named minor planets
19170525